Ribeira de Alto Mira is a stream in the northwestern part of the island of Santo Antão in Cape Verde. Its source is west of the mountain Gudo de Cavaleiro. It flows towards the northwest, entirely within the parish of Santo André, Porto Novo municipality. It passes the settlements of Alto Mira and Chã de Branquinho before emptying into the Atlantic Ocean.

See also
List of streams in Cape Verde

References

Alto Mira
Geography of Santo Antão, Cape Verde
Porto Novo Municipality